Anne Kerr may refer to:

Anne Stanley, Countess of Ancram (1600–1657), also Anne Kerr, English noblewoman
Anne, Lady Kerr (1914–1997), Australian interpreter, second wife of the Governor-General of Australia, John Kerr
Anne Kerr (politician) (1925–1973), UK politician
Anne B. Kerr (fl. 2008), American academic
Anne Ker (1766–1821), English romance and Gothic novelist
Ann Maree Kerr (born 1967), Australian rhythmic gymnast